Amfepentorex is a stimulant drug derived from methamphetamine which is used as an appetite suppressant for the treatment of obesity. Dosage is 50–100 mg per day. Side effects include insomnia, hypertension and acute glaucoma.

References 

Methamphetamines
Anorectics
Norepinephrine-dopamine releasing agents